is a railway station on the Hokkaido Shinkansen in the town of Imabetsu in Aomori Prefecture, on the island of Honshu, Japan. It is operated by Hokkaido Railway Company (JR Hokkaido), and is the last stop in Honshu before the Seikan Tunnel to Hokkaido.

Lines
Okutsugaru-Imabetsu Station is served by the Hokkaido Shinkansen between Tokyo or Shin-Aomori and Shin-Hakodate-Hokuto. After the beginning of the bullet train services, the Kaikyō Line is normally only used by freight trains.

Station layout
Before the Hokkaido Shinkansen stations were made, Tsugaru-Imabetsu Station had two opposed side platforms serving two tracks. There was no station building, but only a small weather shelter on the platform. The station was unattended.

Although the station is in the middle of the  section shared by the standard-gauge Hokkaido Shinkansen and the-narrow gauge Kaikyō Line, narrow gauge trains use separate tracks (two each) on the both sides of the Shinkansen station so that only bullet trains pass through the passenger platforms.

It is physically connected to Tsugaru-Futamata Station on the JR East Tsugaru Line by an underground passage.

Platforms

History

 on the Kaikyō Line opened on 13 March 1988. From 2002, only the limited express Hakuchō services stopped at this station. According to the 2015 timetable, there were two trains per day in each direction.

The station became a stop on the Hokkaido Shinkansen on 26 March 2016 and was renamed, becoming Okutsugaru-Imabetsu Station. As the work to convert the Tsugaru-Imabetsu Station into the Shinkansen station was in progress, passenger services at the station were suspended from 10 August 2015. From August 2015, there were no train services at this station due to the work to convert the station to a stop on the high-speed line.

Surrounding area

 Tsugaru-Futamata Station on the Tsugaru Line
 Road Station Imabetsu "Asukuru"

See also
 List of railway stations in Japan

References

External links
Location map 
JR Hokkaido Station Map 

Railway stations in Aomori Prefecture
Stations of Hokkaido Railway Company
Hokkaido Shinkansen
Tsugaru-Kaikyō Line
Imabetsu, Aomori
Railway stations in Japan opened in 1988